Huldreich Georg Früh (15 June 1903 – 25 April 1945) was a Swiss composer.

References

External links 
 

1903 births
1945 deaths
20th-century classical composers
20th-century male musicians
Swiss classical composers
Swiss male classical composers
20th-century Swiss composers